Thomas Tomlin may refer to:

 Thomas Tomlin, Baron Tomlin, British judge
Tommy Tomlin, American football player

See also
Thomas Tomlins (disambiguation)